The Adventures of Jane is a 1949 British comedy film directed by Edward G. Whiting.  It is the film version of the stage show based on the comic strip Jane originally created by Norman Pett. It was written by Alfred Goulding and Con West. The cast included Chrystabel Leighton-Porter, who played Jane, and Michael Hogarth, who played Tom Hawke. It was filmed in Brighton, East Sussex, England.

Plot
On the last night of her act at the Gaiety Theatre, Jane meets Snade, her supposed fan. He gives her a diamond bracelet, saying it is a "token of his appreciation." Jane, unsuspecting, gladly accepts his gift. Later that evening, she is visited by Tom, an old friend. She tells him that she is judging a beauty contest at the Tudor Close Hotel in Brighton. He agrees to join her.

The next morning at the railway station Jane has one of her iconic wardrobe malfunctions and is left in only her underwear. She is rescued by Captain Cleaver (who, unknown to Jane, is the leader of a gang of diamond smugglers) who lends her his coat. Before the beauty contest, Tom takes Jane to dinner. There, he tells her that he is on a 'special job' in Brighton and is after a gang of diamond smugglers. He also tells her that her bracelet is only paste. Tom becomes increasingly jealous of Cleaver during the evening, and is angry when Jane agrees to go on a date with Cleaver on his Yacht. The next morning, Cleaver discreetly exchanges the central diamond in the bracelet for one his friends have smuggled into England. So when Jane goes through customs, the diamond is not suspected. Afterwards, he tries to steal it back, but failing to do so, he and his friends decide that they must kidnap both Jane and the bracelet.

They lure Jane and Fritz to a remote cottage. But, unknown to the gang, Jane had already given the bracelet to Ruby, Cleaver's long-suffering girlfriend. After putting an SOS in Fritz's collar, Jane smuggles him out and tells him to go back to the inn and to get help. Back at the inn, Tom discovers one of the spivs searching Jane's room for the bracelet, but gets knocked out by the criminal before he can raise the alarm. Meanwhile, Snade sees Ruby wearing the diamonds. He snatches them and makes his way to Cleaver's cottage. Realising that the police are on their track, Cleaver and his gang clear out of the cottage, taking Jane with them, but they throw her out of the car soon afterwards. Snade who is also being chased by the police, decides to destroy the evidence and throws the bracelet out of the car window. Jane, who is composing herself at the bottom of the embankment where she had been thrown has the diamond bracelet fall (literally) into her lap. Cleaver, Snade and the rest of the gang continue to be chased until they are cornered by the police.

Cast
Chrystabel Leighton-Porter as Jane Gay
Fritz as himself
Michael Hogarth as Tom Hawke
Ian Colin as Captain Cleaver
Sonya O'Shea as Ruby
Edward Stanelli as the Hotel Manager
Wally Patch as the Customs Official
Peter Butterworth as the Drunken Man
Norman Pett as himself

Production
The Adventures of Jane was shot entirely in Brighton and the surrounding countryside.

In the beginning credits, Chrystabel Leighton-Porter poses for Norman Pett for a drawing entitled Jane in the Navy. Although Leighton-Porter starred in the film, she was not credited. It simply said: "starring Jane and Fritz." The reason for this is unknown (Leighton-Porter was credited in the brochure released by Eros Films), but possibly it was due to the fact that to many people, Jane's character was almost a real person; her daily misadventures had comforted and raised their spirits during the horrors of World War II.

The film had an extremely low budget, even recruiting Leighton-Porter's husband Arthur to be an extra. Chrystabel Leighton-Porter later said: "It really was simply awful. I was no film actress, and the feeble plot and script didn't help much either!"

DVD release 
The Adventures Of Jane was released on a 2-in-1 disc with Murder at 3am in 2008, region 2 format.

Other adaptations of Jane
There has been several other screen adaptations of the comic character 'Jane'. In 1987, Kirsten Hughes starred in the film Jane and the Lost City. Also in the 1980s, was a BBC TV series was made starring Glynis Barber as Jane. 
Chrystabel Leighton-Porter who starred in The Adventures of Jane also appeared in the striptease act as Jane.

References

Jane a Pin-Up at War by Andy Saunders

External links
 

1949 films
1949 comedy films
British comedy films
Films based on British comics
Films based on comic strips
Live-action films based on comics
Films set in Brighton and Hove
British black-and-white films
1940s English-language films
1940s British films